Janne Korhonen (born March 30, 1970, in Oulu, Finland), 195 cm/120 kg (6′4.75″/265 lbs/18 stone 11 lbs), reach 206 cm (6′9″) is a Finnish taekwondo athlete. He used to compete in the ITF (International Taekwon-Do Federation)'s competitions. His best achievements are three personal European Championship gold medals in 1992, 1993 and 1999.

Korhonen started to train athletics and cross-country skiing at an early age. He started combat sports at the age of 12. After a few years of karate, he started taekwondo. After being promoted as a black belt in 1991, he debuted in the national team of his native country. His competitive career in taekwondo lasted from 1988 to 1999. During that period of time he participated European Championships five times and World Championships twice, among other international and national competitions.

Korhonen also cross-trained multiple other sports to improve his performance in taekwondo. On field, for example, he threw 2 kg discus 58.32m., and on track, ran 100m in 11,2 secs. His standing long jump peaked at 340 cm  and power clean at 190 kg. His instructor on the early years of training was Grand Master Fikret Güler, 9. dan.

Janne korhonen is a medical doctor by profession.

See also
 Korean martial arts
 Taekwon-Do
 International Taekwondo Federation

References

 Taekwon-do European Championships` results AETF's statistics
 Tilastopaja`s statistics

External links
 Janne Korhonen in Finnish

1970 births
Living people
Sportspeople from Oulu
Finnish male taekwondo practitioners